Pleasant Hill Adventist Academy (PHA) was founded in 1953 as a Seventh-day Adventist Elementary and Junior High School in Pleasant Hill, California. It is a part of the Seventh-day Adventist education system, the world's second largest Christian school system.
It is an elementary, middle school, and high school, PHAA is a co-ed school, and is fully accredited with the Western Association of Schools and Colleges and the Accrediting Association of Seventh-day Adventist Schools, Colleges and Universities.

History
PHAA had its beginning in 1953, when it was known as Pleasant Hill Junior Academy. It became Pleasant Hill Christian School when it became a 12 grade school in 1998 and changed its name to Pleasant Hill Adventist Academy. It is a part of the Northern California Conference of Seventh-day Adventists educational system and it is a part of the Seventh-day Adventist education system, the world's second largest Christian school system.

Academics
Pleasant Hills Adventist Academy is accredited by the Western Association of Schools and Colleges.

Athletics
The Academy offers the following sports:
Basketball (boys & girls)
Flag Football (boys)
Soccer (boys & girls)
Volleyball (boys & girls)

Music
In addition, the school sponsors for those interested in music, Choir for all students all years of attendance, and for high school students the Chamber Singers. Handbells is available for those in high school. Orchestra is offered from third to eighth grade.

Spiritual aspects
All students take religion classes each year that they are enrolled. These classes cover topics in biblical history and Christian and denominational doctrines. Instructors in other disciplines also begin each class period with prayer or a short devotional thought, many which encourage student input. Weekly, the entire student body gathers together in the auditorium for an hour-long chapel service.
Outside the classrooms there is year-round spiritually oriented programming that relies on student involvement.

See also

 List of Seventh-day Adventist secondary schools
 Seventh-day Adventist education

References

Educational institutions established in 1923
Adventist secondary schools in the United States
Schools in Contra Costa County, California
Private middle schools in California
Private elementary schools in California
Christian schools in California
1923 establishments in California